Osiek  is a village in Starogard County, Pomeranian Voivodeship, in northern Poland. It is the seat of the gmina (administrative district) called Gmina Osiek.

For details of the history of the region, see History of Pomerania.

The village has a population of 1,012.

References

Castles of the Teutonic Knights
Osiek